David L. Baker was a justice of the Iowa Supreme Court from 2008 to December 31, 2010.

Justice Baker attended undergraduate and law school at the University of Iowa, receiving his bachelor's degree in 1975 with Honors in Sociology and his Juris Doctor degree in 1979 with high honors, Order of the Coif. Following graduation from law school, Justice Baker worked in the private practice of law for 25 years. In 2005 Justice Baker was appointed as a District Court Judge for the Sixth Judicial District. He was appointed to the Iowa Court of Appeals in 2006 where he served until his appointment to the Iowa Supreme Court in 2008.

As a Justice, Baker was part of the unanimous Iowa Supreme Court ruling legally recognizing same-sex marriage in Iowa, and was removed from office after a judicial retention election, following campaigning by groups opposed to same-sex marriage including the National Organization for Marriage.

In 2012, Baker received a Profile in Courage Award from the John F. Kennedy Library Foundation, along with fellow justices Marsha K. Ternus and Michael J. Streit.  In his acceptance speech he stated "The three of us up for retention made a deliberate decision not to form campaign committees"

Justice Baker is an Adjunct Faculty Member at Iowa Law. As of 2019, he was a member of the Iowa Judicial Nominating Commission and the Cedar Rapids Board of Ethics.

References

External links

Justices of the Iowa Supreme Court
Living people
Year of birth missing (living people)